Ali Kılıçoğlu (born 1 March 1944) is a Turkish boxer. He competed in the men's light welterweight event at the 1968 Summer Olympics.

References

External links
 

1944 births
Living people
Turkish male boxers
Olympic boxers of Turkey
Boxers at the 1968 Summer Olympics
Sportspeople from Konya
Light-welterweight boxers
20th-century Turkish people